Lampy may refer to:

 Bassin de Lampy, France, a reservoir
 nickname of Allan Lamport (1903–1999), Canadian politician, mayor of Toronto, Ontario
 A character in the film The Brave Little Toaster
 A lighting technician
 A light board operator

See also
 The Lampies, an English children's animated television series